Thomas Michael Carter (born 15 September 1987), known professionally as Tom Austen, is an English actor, known for his television appearances portraying Jasper Frost on The Royals and Guy Hopkins on Grantchester.

Early life
Born in the county of Hampshire and raised in Taunton, Somerset, Austen attended Queen's College, Taunton and then the Guildhall School of Music and Drama. His younger brother, Freddy Carter, is also an actor.

Career
Austen's first acting job was portraying rent boy Anto in an episode of the UK series Shameless in 2010. He played multi-episode roles on The Borgias and Beaver Falls in 2012, and starred as Marc Bayard in the police procedural series Jo in 2013. After his costarring role as Grantchester Guy Hopkins in 2014, Austen began portraying duplicitous bodyguard Jasper Frost on the E! drama series The Royals in 2015. In October 2019, Austen was cast as Daimon Helstrom in the Hulu series Helstrom.

Filmography

Film

Television

Video games

References

External links
 

Living people
1988 births
21st-century English male actors
English male film actors
English male soap opera actors
Male actors from Hampshire
Male actors from Somerset
People educated at Queen's College, Taunton
People from Taunton